The Heart of Wessex Line, also known as the Bristol to Weymouth Line, is a railway line that runs from  to  and Weymouth in England.

History

Places served
The cities, towns and villages served by this route are listed below:
Bristol
Keynsham
Bath
Freshford
Avoncliff
Bradford on Avon
Trowbridge
Westbury
Frome
Bruton
Castle Cary
Yeovil
Thornford
Yetminster
Chetnole
Maiden Newton
Dorchester
Upwey
Weymouth

Operator
Passenger services on the route are operated by Great Western Railway and South Western Railway.

South Western Railway operate a limited service between London Waterloo and Yeovil Junction via Castle Cary.

Rolling stock
Services are typically operated with Class 165 and Class 166 "Networker Turbo" trains. These were introduced in the late 2010s after they were released from the Thames Valley during the modernisation of the Great Western Main Line. South Western Railway services are operated by Class 159s and sometimes Class 158.

Before the introduction of the Networker Turbo trains, the route was typically operated with Sprinter diesel multiple unit trains, typically of 2 or 3 coach Class 150, with some Class 158 trains. 

Past rolling stock has included locomotive-hauled trains, including British Railways Mark 2 coaches hauled by Class 67 used to strengthen high-demand summer Saturday services in 2008–2010 between Bristol and the seaside resort of Weymouth.

Community rail
A Bristol to Weymouth Rail Partnership was created in 1998 so that local authorities could support the line. In 2003 this was rebranded as the Heart of Wessex partnership and line. It is designated as a community rail line.

Accidents and incidents
On 18 March 1849, a passenger train became divided approaching . The rear portion then ran into the front portion when the latter stopped at the station. One person was injured.
On 20 January 1853 a luggage train was derailed near Keynsham due to an axle failure on one of the carriages.
On 7 June 1865, a passenger train ran into the rear of another near Keynsham, and an empty stock train ran into the wreckage. At least three people were injured.

On 4 August 1868, a passenger train collided with the buffer stops at  due to poor rail conditions and driver error. Six people were injured.
On 11 June 1875, a passenger train was derailed at Bathampton Junction. One person was killed and six were injured, three seriously.
On 2 July 1876, a freight train was derailed at Bathampton Junction.
On 15 August 1876, a freight train was derailed at Hampton Row after a bale of cotton fell off a wagon and derailed the one behind it.
On 24 October 1882, a passenger train was derailed near  when a bridge collapsed under it due to a storm. Several people were injured, on seriously.
On 8 August 1913, a passenger train ran into the rear of another at  due to passing a signal at danger. Two people were killed and ten injured, two seriously.
On 11 January 1966, an express passenger train ran into the rear of another at  due to a signalman's error. A locomotive was then in a sidelong collision with the wreckage. Nineteen passengers were injured. Diesel-hydraulic locomotive D 1071 Western Druid was severely damaged; D 864 Zambesi was slightly damaged.
On 25 August 1974, a passenger train was derailed at  after passing a signal at danger. Eighteen people were injured.
On 24 March 1987, a passenger train and a freight train were in a head-on collision at  due to the freight train passing a signal at danger. Locomotives 33 032 and 47 202 were severely damaged. Fifteen people were injured, some seriously.
On 10 November 2008, a freight train was derailed at East Somerset Junction due to a signalman's error.
There were no injuries.
On 20 March 2017, a freight train was derailed at East Somerset Junction. The line was closed until 25 March.

References

Bibliography
  
   
   ISBN(no ISBN)

External links
Heart of Wessex line – The Heart of Wessex Rail Partnership

Rail transport in Wiltshire
Community railway lines in England
Rail transport in Dorset
Railway lines in South West England
Wessex